The Karlovy Vary International Film Festival is a film festival held annually in July in Karlovy Vary, Czech Republic. The Karlovy Vary Festival is one of the oldest in the world and has become Central and Eastern Europe's leading film event.

History

The pre-war dream of many enthusiastic filmmakers materialized in 1946 when a non-competition festival of films from seven countries took place in Mariánské Lázně and Karlovy Vary. Above all it was intended to screen the results of the recently nationalized Czechoslovak film industry. After the first two years the festival moved permanently to Karlovy Vary.

The Karlovy Vary IFF first held an international film competition in 1948. Since 1951, an international jury has evaluated the films. The Karlovy Vary competition quickly found a place among other developing festivals and by 1956 FIAPF had already classified Karlovy Vary as a category A festival. Given the creation of the Moscow Film Festival and the political decision to organize only one "A" festival for all socialist countries, Karlovy Vary was forced to alternate year by year with Moscow IFF between 1959 and 1993.

The social and political changes that took place after the Velvet Revolution in November 1989 pushed concerns about organizing the Karlovy Vary IFF to the background. The program for 1990 was saved by the release of a collection of Czechoslovak films which had been locked up for years in a storage vault. And the appearance of a number of international guests such as Miloš Forman, Lindsay Anderson, Annette Bening and Robert De Niro helped as well. Future festivals were in doubt. Financial problems and a lack of interest on the part of the government, organizers and viewers almost ended the festival's long tradition in 1992.

In 1994, the 29th Karlovy Vary IFF inaugurated an entirely new tradition. After nearly forty years of alternating with the Moscow IFF, the festival began once again to take place every year. The Karlovy Vary Film Festival Foundation was set up in 1993 co-created by the Ministry of Culture, The City of Karlovy Vary, and the Grand Hotel Pupp. Actor Jiří Bartoška was invited to be the festival's president, and Eva Zaoralová became program director in 1995. Since 1998, the organization of the festival has been carried out by Film Servis Festival Karlovy Vary, a joint stock company.

The 2020 edition was cancelled due to the COVID-19 pandemic; a shortened event was later scheduled for 18–21 November, which will not be counted as an official edition of the festival (being promoted as the 54th and-a-half edition). Due to the ongoing Russo-Ukrainian War, portions of the Odesa International Film Festival will be hosted at KVIFF in July 2022.

Program

The main center of the festival is Hotel Thermal. The core of the program is the feature film competition; in accordance with FIAPF regulations only those films which have not been shown in competition at any other international festivals can be included. The documentary competition is an important festival event. The extensive informative program features both distribution pre-premiers and films awarded at other festivals. But it also includes discoveries of artistic creations by independent directors, productions coming out of little known film industries, retrospectives, and an overview of Czech film output during the past year. For the tenth straight year the festival will present Variety Critics' Choice: new and interesting films of mainly European production selected by critics working at this prestigious magazine.

Seminars focusing primarily on European film are another important part of the festival.

Thousands of visitors and the great variety of films testify to the effectiveness of the program team with program director Eva Zaoralová at its head. Due to their valiant efforts many films will be purchased at the festival for wider distribution or, thanks to receiving a festival award, will attract the attention of major producers, distributors, and the media.

The festival program has the following sections:
 Official Selection - Competition – films never before shown in competition at any other international festival.
 East of the West - Competition – films from the former socialist bloc.
 Documentary Films - Competition – a competition divided into two parts: documentaries less than and longer than 30 minutes.
 Horizons and Another View – a selection of the most remarkable contemporary films.
 Imagina – films with an unconventional approach to narration and style, distinctive and radical visions of film language.
 Out of the Past – classic, cult, rare and unfairly overlooked films, screened in their original and restored versions.
 Future Frames: Generation NEXT of European Cinema – ten directors, an upcoming generation of young European filmmakers, present their student films. The project is organized in cooperation with European Film Promotion.
 Midnight Screenings – a selection of the latest horror and action films, works that look at their genres in new, often humorous, ways.
 Czech Films – a representative selection of current Czech films.
 Tributes, special focuses and retrospectives

Awards
Since 1948, the Grand Prize has been the Crystal Globe – although its form has often changed. As of the 35th Karlovy Vary IFF 2000 the Crystal Globe has taken on a new look: now the figure of a woman stands raising a crystal ball (artistic concept developed by Tono Stano, Aleš Najbrt, Michal Caban, and Šimon Caban).

The Feature Film Competition is divided into the following main awards: 
 Grand Prix – Crystal Globe for best feature film ($25,000)
 Special Jury Prize ($15,000)
 Best Director Award
 Best Actress Award
 Best Actor Award

The Documentary Competition is divided into the following main awards:
 Best Documentary Film in the category for film lasting 30 minutes or less
 Best Documentary Film in the category for film lasting above 30 minutes in length

Each year, the festival also presents the Crystal Globe for Outstanding Contribution to World Cinema.

Prominent foreign guests

 1946: Nikolay Cherkasov, Lyubov Orlova, Rita Hayworth
1956: Dev Anand, Luis Buñuel, Alberto Cavalcanti
 1960: Waltraut Haas, Irina Skobtseva, Irina Petrescu, Mari Törőcsik
 1962: Shirley MacLaine, Frank Capra, Bernard Blier
 1964: Claudia Cardinale, Henry Fonda, Richard Attenborough
 1966: Olga Schoberová, Brad Harris, Ján Kadár
 1968: Tony Curtis, Pierre Brice, Raf Vallone
 1970: Ken Loach
 1982: Franco Nero
 1984: Monica Vitti
 1986: Giulietta Masina
 1988: Bernardo Bertolucci
 1990: Miloš Forman, Robert De Niro, Annette Bening, Maximilian Schell, Shirley Temple
 1992: Coen brothers, Jason Connery, Aki Kaurismäki, Ken Loach, Agnieszka Holland
 1994: Leonardo DiCaprio, Max von Sydow, Philippe Noiret
 1995: Peter O'Toole, Fridrik Thór Fridriksson, Mia Farrow, Mika Kaurismäki, Gina Lollobrigida
 1996: Alan Alda, Whoopi Goldberg, Gregory Peck, Ivan Passer, Pierre Richard, Frank Langella
 1997: Miloš Forman, Salma Hayek, Ivan Passer, Nikita Mikhalkov, Steve Buscemi
 1998: Michael Douglas, Ornella Muti, Saul Zaentz, Terry Jones
 1999: Woody Harrelson, Lukas Moodysson, Nikita Mikhalkov
 2000: Woody Harrelson, Edward Norton, Fridrik Thór Fridriksson, Eli Wallach, Heather Graham, Alicia Silverstone
 2001: Scarlett Johansson, Nastassja Kinski, Oleg Taktarov, Thora Birch
 2002: Kim Ki-duk, Keira Knightley, István Szabó, Michael York
 2003: Morgan Freeman, William Forsythe, Kim Ki-duk, Udo Kier, Zlatko Topčić
 2004: Elijah Wood, Roman Polanski, Jacqueline Bisset, John Cleese, Bernard Hill, Harvey Keitel, Albert Maysles
 2005: Sharon Stone, Robert Redford, Alexander Payne, Gael García Bernal, Liv Ullmann, Matt Dillon, Catherine Deneuve
 2006: Andy García, Terry Gilliam, Kim Ki-duk, Danny Trejo
 2007: Renée Zellweger, Danny DeVito, Elliot Page, Tom DiCillo, Cybill Shepherd
 2008: Robert De Niro, Les Blank, Kim Bodnia, Saffron Burrows, Danny Glover, John Sayles, Christopher Lee
 2009: Antonio Banderas, John Malkovich, Isabelle Huppert
 2010: Jude Law, Nikita Mikhalkov, Kevin McDonald, Scott Cooper, Zlatko Topčić, Adrian Grenier
 2011: John Malkovich, Judi Dench, John Turturro, Cary Fukunaga, Sasson Gabai, Remo Girone
 2012: Helen Mirren, Susan Sarandon, Richard Peña, István Szabó, Helena Třeštíková
 2013: John Travolta, Oliver Stone, F. Murray Abraham, Valeria Golino, Agnieszka Holland, Lou Castel, Jerry Schatzberg, Michel Gondry
 2014: Mel Gibson, Michael Pitt, Jake Hoffman, Franco Nero, Fanny Ardant, Laura Dern, Mike Cahill, Astrid Bergès-Frisbey
 2015: Richard Gere, Harvey Keitel, George A. Romero, Jamie Dornan, Sean Ellis, Jena Malone, Ryan Fleck, Udo Kier, Ben Mendelsohn, Alba Rohrwacher
 2016: Jean Reno, Willem Dafoe, Charlie Kaufman, Sergi López, Adriana Ugarte, Emma Suárez, Jamie Dornan, Toby Jones
 2017: Uma Thurman, Casey Affleck, Jeremy Renner, James Newton Howard, Ken Loach
 2018: Tim Robbins, Robert Pattinson, Terry Gilliam, Taika Waititi, Anna Paquin, Barry Levinson
 2019: Julianne Moore, Casey Affleck, Patricia Clarkson, Billy Crudup
 2021: Johnny Depp, Ethan Hawke, Michael Caine
 2022: Geoffrey Rush, Benicio del Toro, Liev Schreiber

Crystal Globe Winners – Grand Prix

 2021 As Far as I Can Walk (Serbia) – director Stefan Arsenijević
 2019 The Father (Bulgaria, Greece) – directors Kristina Grozeva, Petar Valchanov
 2018 I Do Not Care If We Go Down in History as Barbarians (Romania) – director Radu Jude
 2017 Little Crusader (Czech Republic) – director Václav Kadrnka
 2016 It's Not the Time of My Life (Hungary) – director Szabolcs Hajdu
 2015 Bob and the Trees (USA, France) – director Diego Ongaro
 2014 Corn Island (Georgia) – director Giorgi Ovashvili
 2013 The Notebook (Hungary) – director János Szász
 2012 The Almost Man (Norway) – director Martin Lund
 2011 Restoration (Israel) – director Yossi (Joseph) Madmoni
 2010 The Mosquito Net (Spain) – director Agustí Vila
 2009 Angel at Sea (Belgium/Canada) – director Frédéric Dumont
 2008 Terribly Happy (Denmark) – director Henrik Ruben Genz
 2007 Jar City (Iceland/Germany) – director Baltasar Kormákur
 2006 Sherrybaby (USA) – director Laurie Collyer
 2005 My Nikifor (Poland) – director Krzysztof Krauze
 2004 A Children's Story (Italy) – director Andrea Frazzi, Antonio Frazzi
 2003 Facing Windows (Italy, GB, Turkey, Portugal) – director Ferzan Özpetek
 2002 Year of The Devil (Czech Republic) – director Petr Zelenka
 2001 Amélie (France) – director Jean-Pierre Jeunet
 2000 Me You Them (Brazil) – director Andrucha Waddington
 1999 Yana's Friends (Israel) – director Arik Kaplun
 1998 Streetheart (Canada) – director Charles Binamé
 1997 Ma vie en rose (Belgium, France, GB) – director Alain Berliner
 1996 Prisoner of the Mountains (Russia, Kazakhstan) – director Sergej Bodrov
 1995 The Ride (Czech republic) – director Jan Svěrák
 1994 My Soul Brother (Spain) – director Mariano Barroso
 for older winners (... 1946) see Crystal Globe.

References

External links

 
 Festivary.cz - Unofficial website
 Karlovy Vary - a film fan’s aqua vitae - Czech.cz, The official Website of the Czech Republic
 Radio Prague monitoring of Karlovy Vary festival 2009

 
June events
July events
Film festivals established in 1946
Film festivals in Karlovy Vary
1946 establishments in Czechoslovakia
Czech Lion Awards winners
Summer events in the Czech Republic